Lütold, Leuthold or Lüthold is a German name, popular in the High Middle Ages.

Historical individuals:
Lütold of Rümligen, founded Rüeggisberg Priory (1072)
Lütold of St. Gallen, Abbot from 1077–1033 in St. Gall
Lutold of Znaim (died 1112) 
Lüthold of Sumiswald, founder of Sumiswald castle (1225)
Lütold of Houwinstein (13th century)
Lütold of Griesenberg, gave possessions to Fischingen monastery in 1316
Leuthold I of Rotheln, bishop of Basel (died 1213)
Lütold I of Aarburg, bishop of Basel (died 1249)
lords of Regensberg:
Lütold of Affoltern (11th century)
Lütold II and his son Lütold III, founder of the Fahr Abbey (1130)
Lütold IV, founder of the Rüti Abbey (1206)
Lütold V, founder of the castle and the town of Regensberg (1244)
Lütold VI, disputed the possession of Regensberg by his brother Ulrich 1267/1268, married Gertrud, daughter of Rudolf III of Habsburg
Lütold VII (sold Regensberg in 1302)
Lütold VIII (died 1326)

Leuthold and Lüthold survive as a surname into modern times. The name is also seen in variant forms such as Leutholdt, Leutholt and Leutelt.
Juerg Leuthold, German engineer
Gustav Leutelt, Bohemian German poet
Hans Leutelt, Czech cyclist

German masculine given names